The 1948 Donora smog killed 20 people and caused respiratory problems for 6,000 of the 14,000 people living in Donora, Pennsylvania, a mill town on the Monongahela River  southeast of Pittsburgh. The event is commemorated by the Donora Smog Museum.

Sixty years later, the incident was described by The New York Times as "one of the worst air pollution disasters in the nation's history." Even 10 years after the incident, mortality rates in Donora were significantly higher than those in other communities nearby.

Incident 
The fog started building up in Donora on Wednesday, October 27, 1948. By the following day it was causing coughing and other signs of respiratory distress for many residents of the community in the Monongahela River valley. Many of the illnesses and deaths were initially attributed to asthma. The smog continued until it rained on Sunday, October 31, by which time 20 residents of Donora had died and approximately one third to one half of the town's population of 14,000 residents had been sickened. Another 50 residents died of respiratory causes within a month after the incident; notable among the fatalities was Lukasz Musial, the father of future baseball Hall of Famer and the 1948 National League MVP Stan Musial.

Hydrogen fluoride and sulfur dioxide emissions from U.S. Steel's Donora Zinc Works and its American Steel & Wire plant were frequent occurrences in Donora. What made the 1948 event more severe was a temperature inversion, a situation in which warmer air aloft traps pollution in a layer of colder air near the surface. The pollutants in the air mixed with fog to form a thick, yellowish, acrid smog that hung over Donora for five days. The sulfuric acid, nitrogen dioxide, fluorine, and other poisonous gases that usually dispersed into the atmosphere were caught in the inversion and accumulated until rain ended the weather pattern.

Two of the heroes to emerge during the four-day smog were Chief John Volk of the Donora Fire Department and his assistant Russell Davis. "I didn’t take any myself. What I did every time I came back to the station was have a little shot of whiskey."

The eight doctors in the town, who belonged to the Donora Medical Association, made house calls much like the firefighters during the period of intense smog, often visiting the houses of patients who were treated by the other doctors in town. This was a result of patients calling every doctor in town in the hope of getting treatment faster. It was not until mid-day Saturday, the 30th, that Mrs. Cora Vernon, executive director of the American Red Cross, had it set up so that all calls going to the doctors’ offices would be switched to the emergency center being established in the town hall. The smog was so intense that driving was nearly abandoned; those who chose to continue driving took risks. “I drove on the left side of the street with my head out the window. Steering by scraping the curb.” recalls Davis.

It was not until Sunday morning, the 31st, that a meeting occurred between the operators of the plants and the town officials. August Z. Chambon, the burgess (mayor) of Donora, requested the plants temporarily cease operations. The superintendent of the plants, L.J. Westhaver, said the plants had already begun shutting down operation at around 6:00 that morning. With the rain alleviating the smog, the plants resumed normal operation the following morning.

Researchers analyzing the event have focused likely blame on pollutants from the zinc plant, whose emissions had killed almost all vegetation within a half-mile radius of the plant. Dr. Devra L. Davis, director of the Center for Environmental Oncology at the University of Pittsburgh Cancer Institute, has pointed to autopsy results showing fluorine levels in victims in the lethal range, as much as 20 times higher than normal. Fluorine gas generated in the zinc smelting process became trapped by the stagnant air and was the primary cause of the deaths. Further research was conducted by Mary Amdur about the effects of the smog; she was pressured to withdraw publication of these results but refused to be bowed.

Aftermath 
Preliminary results of a study performed by Clarence A. Mills of the University of Cincinnati and released in December 1948 showed that thousands more Donora residents could have been killed if the smog had lasted any longer than it had.

Lawsuits were filed against U.S. Steel, which never acknowledged responsibility for the incident, calling it "an act of God". While the steel company did not accept blame, it reached a settlement in 1951 in which it paid about $235,000, which was stretched over the 80 victims who had participated in the lawsuit, leaving them little after legal expenses were factored in. Representatives of American Steel and Wire settled the more than $4.6 million claimed in 130 damage suits at about 5% of what had been sought, noting that the company was prepared to show at trial that the smog had been caused by a "freak weather condition" that trapped over Donora "all of the smog coming from the homes, railroads, the steamboats, and the exhaust from automobiles, as well as the effluents from its plants." U.S. Steel closed both plants by 1966.

By 1949, a year after the disaster, the total value of the predominantly residential property in Donora had declined by nearly 10%.

The Donora Smog was one of the incidents where Americans recognized that exposure to large amounts of pollution in a short period of time can result in injuries and fatalities. The event is often credited for helping to trigger the clean-air movement in the United States, whose crowning achievement was the Clean Air Act of 1963, which required the United States Environmental Protection Agency to develop and enforce regulations to protect the general public from exposure to hazardous airborne contaminants.

The incident was little spoken of in Donora until a historical marker was placed in the town in 1998, to commemorate the 50th anniversary of the incident. The 60th anniversary, in 2008, was commemorated with memorials for the families of the victims and other educational programs. The Donora Smog Museum was opened on October 20, 2008, located in an old storefront at 595 McKean Avenue near Sixth Street, with the slogan "Clean Air Started Here". Fewer than 6,000 people still live in Donora.

Media coverage and influence 

The Donora event led to the first large-scale epidemiological investigation of an environmental health disaster in the United States.

An account of the smog was published in 1950 by the noted medical writer Berton Roueché in The New Yorker under the title "The Fog".  Together with another article,  "A Pig From Jersey" (about a mass-case of foodborne illness), this article won him the 1950 Albert Lasker Medical Journalism Award. "The Fog" was later included in his celebrated collection of short stories Eleven Blue Men.
Devra Davis' 2002 novel When Smoke Ran Like Water starts with the Donora Smog.

The 2009 novel Don't Kill the Messenger by Joel Pierson features a fictional town, Wyandotte, Pennsylvania, which became a ghost town after a smog incident, based on the Donora Smog.

An hour-long documentary, Rumor of Blue Sky, produced by Andrew Maietta and Janet Whitney, aired on WQED TV in April 2009. The film features archival images and interviews with survivors of the environmental tragedy.

The Donora smog incident was mentioned in Netflix's The Crown in 2016, when it depicted a similar incident in London in 1952.

The Weather Channel produced an episode of When Weather Changed History on the Donora smog incident. The incident would be revisited in a later Weather Channel series, Weather That Changed The World.

In 1995, the Pennsylvania Historical and Museum Commission installed a historical marker noting the historic importance of the event.

See also 
1930 Meuse Valley fog
1939 St. Louis smog
2013 Eastern China smog
Great Smog of London
Pea soup fog

References

Sources 
Overview of the 1948 Donora Smog, Pennsylvania Department of Environmental Protection

Don Hopey (2008). Museum remembers Donora's deadly 1948 smog: story by Pittsburgh Post-Gazette. Retrieved October 21, 2008.
Weather Channel (2008). When Weather Changed History: Killer Smog. Retrieved November 6, 2008.

Smog events
Donora Smog, 1948
Donora Smog
Donora Smog
Environmental disasters in the United States
Donora Smog, 1948
Donora Smog
Donora Smog
U.S. Steel